The 1947 Houston Cougars football team was an American football team that represented the University of Houston during the 1947 college football season as a member of the Lone Star Conference (LSC). In its second season under head coach Jewell Wallace, the team compiled a 3–8 record (0–6 against LSC opponents) and finished in the last place in the conference. The team played its home games at Public School Stadium in Houston.

Schedule

References

Houston
Houston Cougars football seasons
Houston Cougars football